The Oldham Era is a weekly newspaper published in Oldham County, Kentucky.

References

External links 
 Oldham Era website

Newspapers published in Kentucky
Oldham County, Kentucky
Publications established in 1876
1876 establishments in Kentucky
La Grange, Kentucky